The 1792–93 United States Senate elections were held on various dates in various states, coinciding with President George Washington's unanimous re-election. As these U.S. Senate elections were prior to the ratification of the Seventeenth Amendment in 1913, senators were chosen by state legislatures. Senators were elected over a wide range of time throughout 1792 and 1793, and a seat may have been filled months late or remained vacant due to legislative deadlock. In these elections, terms were up for the ten senators in Class 2.

Formal organized political parties had yet to form in the United States, but two political factions were present: The coalition of Senators who supported George Washington's administration were known as the Pro-Administration Party, and the Senators against him as the Anti-Administration Party.

Results summary 
Senate party division, 3rd Congress (1793–1795)

 Majority party: Pro-Administration Party (16)
 Minority party: Anti-Administration Party (13)
 Other parties: 0
 Total seats: 30
 Vacant: 1 (later filled by Pro-Administration)

Change in composition 
Note: There were no political parties in this Congress. Members are informally grouped into factions of similar interest, based on an analysis of their voting record.

Virginia's elections are considered a single race here.

Before the elections 
After the June 1792 admission of Kentucky.

Results of the election

Beginning of the next Congress 
Two Pro-Administration senators (Benjamin Hawkins of North Carolina and John Langdon of New Hampshire) changed to Anti-Administration.

The vacant seat in Pennsylvania was filled February 28, 1793 by an Anti-Administration senator.

Race summaries 
Except if/when noted, the number following candidates is the whole number vote(s), not a percentage.

Elections during the 2nd Congress 
In these elections, the winner was seated before March 4, 1793; ordered by election date.

Races leading to the 3rd Congress 
In these regular elections, the winner was seated on March 4, 1793; ordered by state.

All of the elections involved the Class 2 seats.

Election in 1793 during the 3rd Congress 
In this special election, the winner was seated after March 4, 1793, the beginning of the next Congress.

Connecticut (special)

Delaware

Georgia 

One-term Anti-Federalist William Few was defeated by fellow Anti-Federalist, James Jackson. Jackson won 24 votes in the Georgia House of Representatives and 11 in the State Senate for a combined total of 35. Few won 3 in the House and 2 in the Senate for a combined total of 5. Jackson took office as a member of the 3rd United States Congress on March 4, 1793. He would later resign in 1795 to run for his state's legislature.

Kentucky 

Incumbent John Brown, who had previously been elected in a special election was easily reelected with no opposition and 100% of votes from the legislators.

Maryland (special) 

Richard Potts won election to fill the seat vacated by Charles Carroll over Josh Hoskins Stone by a margin of 21.84%, or 19 votes, for the Class 1 seat.

Massachusetts

New Hampshire 

Incumbent U.S. Senator Paine Wingate was not reelected. The New Hampshire General Court instead elected Federalist Samuel Livermore, a U.S. Representative, to the seat. Livermore, like his fellow senator, John Langdon, would go on to serve as President Pro-Tempore during this term.

New Jersey

North Carolina 

Pro-Administration Samuel Johnston lost re-election to Anti-Administration Alexander Martin for the class 2 seat.  The other senator, Benjamin Hawkins, switched his support from Pro- to Anti-Administration.

Pennsylvania (special) 

There was a special election on February 28, 1793 for the Class 1 seat from Pennsylvania. Incumbent William Maclay's term had ended on March 3, 1791, but the legislature failed to elect a successor due to a disagreement on the procedure to be followed in the election.

The seat remained vacant until Albert Gallatin was elected by the Pennsylvania General Assembly to the seat during this election.

Upon agreement between the two houses of the Pennsylvania General Assembly, the House of Representatives and the Senate, regarding the procedure to elect a new Senator, an election was finally held on February 28, 1793. The results of the vote of both houses combined are as follows:

On February 28, 1794, the Senate determined that Gallatin did not satisfy the citizenship requirement for service and he was removed from office. He later went on to serve in the U.S. House of Representatives. Gallatin was replaced in the Senate by a special election in 1794.

Rhode Island

South Carolina

Virginia 

Anti-Administration senator Richard Henry Lee resigned October 8, 1792, just before the March 3, 1793 end of term. Anti-administration John Taylor of Caroline was elected October 18, 1792 to finish Lee's term and then re-elected in 1793 to the next term.

Special

Regular

See also
 1792 United States elections
 1792 United States presidential election
 1792–93 United States House of Representatives elections
 2nd United States Congress
 3rd United States Congress

References

External links
 Party Division in the Senate, 1789–present via Senate.gov